The Bigger Picture may refer to:
The Bigger Picture (film), a 2014 British short film
"The Bigger Picture" (song), a 2020 song by Lil Baby